KIO (KDE Input/Output) is a system library incorporated into the KDE architecture.

KIO may also refer to:

Kiō, a Japanese professional shogi title
 Kio, stage name of a Soviet magician dynasty
Emil Kio

Igor Kio
Kachin Independence Organisation
Keep Ireland Open, an organisation that campaigns for open access to the Irish countryside
An abbreviation of Kibioctet, a unit of information or computer storage
Kick It Out (organisation), an organisation that aims to keep racism out of football
Kin On stop (MTR station code: KIO), Hong Kong
Kuwait Investment Office, the London office of Kuwait Investment Authority
Sida fallax, a flowering plant in the Hibiscus family

People:
, Japanese footballer
, a Japanese manga artist 
YoungKio, stage name of Dutch record producer Kiowa Roukema

Japanese-language surnames
Japanese masculine given names